North Korean studies is a sub-area of Korean studies. The number of researchers is comparatively small. The only fully dedicated institution to the study area is the University of North Korean Studies, Seoul, but many universities run undergraduate courses and postgraduate research programs.

The field has been unable to achieve consensus on even some fundamental questions, such as whether North Korea should be characterized as a communist or fascist state and what is the level of involvement of the government in human right abuses.

North Korean studies suffers from a lack of primary sources from the country, although the situation varies by decade. Sources from the 1940s are mostly Soviet documents available from archives. Documents from the 1950s are harder to come by. Some were smuggled out of the country, but the bulk of scholarship is done on reports of Eastern Bloc embassies in North Korea. , Soviet documents from the 1960s are in the process of being declassified, but sources from Eastern European countries are already available. The availability of documents from the 1950s and especially the 1960s is contrasted with the fact that most of that which happened in North Korea took place outside of diplomatic circles, and foreign diplomats were given less and less information as time passed. Sources from the 1970s and 1980s are especially scarce outside of a selection of official publications. Beginning with the 1990s, scholarship has relied on testimonies of North Korean defectors.

Academic departments

 Korea University
 Dongguk University, 50 students
 University of Central Lancashire MA North Korean Studies
 DPRK Strategic Research Center, KIMEP University

Academic projects
 North Korea International Documentation Project, NKIDP

Journals and webpages
 38 North - analysis website formerly at Johns Hopkins University, now at The Stimson Center
Hyundae Pukhan Yongu - Contemporary North Korean Studies (현대 북한 연구)
 NK News - a news website
 Daily NK - a news and opinion website
 Sino-NK - an independent periodical
 North Korea Review - previously published by the Jamestown Foundation
 North Korean Review - an English-language academic journal fully devoted to North Korean studies by Yonsei University
 North Korea Tech - technology analysis blog, affiliated with 38 North
 Citizens' Alliance for North Korean Human Rights - Quarterly journal (1996-2012)
 International Journal of Korean Unification Studies
Routledge Research on Korea Series.

Other DPRK-focussed institutions conducting research
Committee for Human Rights in North Korea
Database Center for North Korean Human Rights
Korea Institute for National Unification
People for Successful Corean Reunification

See also

Media coverage of North Korea
:Category:Experts on North Korea

References

Further reading

External links
 NORTH KOREAN STUDIES - СЕВЕРОКОРЕЙСКИЕ ИССЛЕДОВАНИЯ Articles and links to Web sites about contemporary North Korean society and politics, relations with Russia and Australia, and Soviet Koreans.
 Sino-NK